The Gambian national cricket team is the team that represents The Gambia in international cricket. They became an affiliate member of the International Cricket Council (ICC) in 2002 and an associate member in 2017.

In April 2018, the ICC decided to grant full Twenty20 International (T20I) status to all its members. Therefore, all Twenty20 matches played between Gambia and other ICC members after 1 January 2019 will be a full T20I.

History
Cricket was introduced to the Gambia by the British during the colonial period. Gambia played against other British West African colonies from 1927, when they faced Sierra Leone for the first time. From the 1960s Gambia also played regularly against Nigeria, and later in the West African Championships.

Gambia was a member of the West Africa Cricket Council, which was an ICC member from 1976 to 2003, and fielded players in the West Africa cricket team until its dissolution. It became a member of the ICC in its own right in 2002. Gambia's ICC debut came at the African affiliate championship in 2004 where they finished sixth. In 2006 they played in the equivalent tournament, Division Three of the African qualifiers for the ICC World Cricket League, this time finishing in seventh place.

In 2021 Gambia was among five teams excluded from the ICC T20I Championship for failing to play enough fixtures in the relevant period, an effect of the COVID-19 pandemic.

Records 
International Match Summary — Gambia
 
Last updated 9 December 2022

Twenty20 International 
T20I record versus other nations

Records complete to T20I #1948. Last updated 9 December 2022.

Other records
For a list of selected international matches played by Gambia, see Cricket Archive.

See also
 List of Gambia Twenty20 International cricketers

References

Further reading
 The Rise, Fall and Rise Again of Cricket in The Gambia by Omar Jarju, 2019

National cricket teams
Cricket
The Gambia in international cricket
Cricket in the Gambia